The Mizoram Premier League (also known as the Zote Honda Mizoram Premier League for sponsorship ties) is the highest state-level football league in Mizoram, India. On a national scale, the state's top tier league is the 4th tier of Indian football league system. The competition is conducted by the Mizoram Football Association, the official football body of Mizoram, with Tetea Hmar as its secretary and key promoter. The league started on 24 October 2012 for the first time.

League structure 

Mizoram Premier League has eight clubs. The four top clubs qualify for the MPL automatically While the other 4 teams will be decided via a playoff . The top 4 teams from the play-off shall qualify for the MPL
The 8 clubs playing for season 8 of MPL are Electric Veng FC, Mizoram Police, Aizawl FC , Chanmari FC , Chawnpui FC, Chhinga Veng FC, FC Venghnuai and Ramhlun North FC.

Teams
 Aizawl FC
 Chanmari FC
 Chawnpui FC
 Chhinga Veng FC
 Electric Veng FC
 Mizoram Police FC
 FC Bethlehem
 FC Venghnuai

Venues
The main venues of the league are Rajiv Gandhi Stadium Mualpui and Lammual.

Media coverage
On 14 June 2012 it was announced that the Mizoram Football Association had signed a five-year  1.25 crore deal with ZONET Cable TV Pvt. Ltd. The deal was signed by Mizoram Football Association president Lal Thanzara, while Zonet Cable TV Director R.K. Lianzuala(of Bethlehem Veng) signed for Zonet. The deal between the MFA and Zonet is one of the most lucrative sports deals in the North East of India. In 2017 it was announced the channel signed another 5 year extension with Mizoram Football Association Worth 1.5 Crores. Mizoram Premier League (MPL) season 8 has been delivered to SONY by Zonet Cable TV and streamed live on SonyLIV. MPL is the first state league to be televised on a national television platform.

Sponsorship

Winners

Awards

Player Awards

Top Scorer

Best Player

Best Goalkeeper

Best Forward

Best Midfielder

Best Defender

See also
Mizoram Football Association

References

External links
 

 
4
2012 establishments in Mizoram
Sports leagues established in 2012
Football in Mizoram